"Goodnight Moon" is a song by American alternative rock band Shivaree, written by Ambrosia Parsley and Duke McVinnie. It is the seventh track on the band's debut album, I Oughtta Give You a Shot in the Head for Making Me Live in This Dump (1999), and was released as the band's debut single on March 24, 2000. The song topped the Italian Singles Chart and also became a top-30 hit in France. Shivaree have not had another such hit, making them a one-hit wonder.

Track listings
Italian and UK CD single
 "Goodnight Moon" – 4:05
 "Scrub" – 5:50
 "My Boy Lollipop" – 2:30

French CD single
 "Goodnight Moon" – 4:04
 "Scrub" – 5:47

Charts

Release history

References

1999 songs
2000 debut singles
Capitol Records singles
Number-one singles in Italy
Shivaree (band) songs
Song recordings produced by Tom Rothrock